Chronemics is the role of time in communication. It is one of several subcategories to emerge from the study of nonverbal communication. According to the Encyclopedia of Special Education "Chronemics includes time orientation, understanding and organisation, the use of and reaction to time pressures the innate and learned awareness of time, by physically wearing or not wearing a watch, arriving, starting, and ending late or on time." A person's perception and values placed on time plays a considerable role in their communication process. The use of time can affect lifestyles, personal relationships, and work life. Across cultures, people usually have different time perceptions, and this can result in conflicts between individuals. Time perceptions include punctuality, interactions, and willingness to wait. Three main types of time in chronemics are: interactive, conceptual, and social.

Definition

Thomas J. Bruneau, a professor in communication at Radford University who focused his studies on nonverbal communication, interpersonal communication, and intercultural communication. He coined the term "chronemics" in the late 1970s to help define the function of time in human interaction:

Time can be used as an indicator of status. For example, in most companies the boss can interrupt progress to hold an impromptu meeting in the middle of the work day, yet the average worker would have to make an appointment to see the boss. The way in which different cultures perceive time can influence communication as well.
Chronemics is the study of the use of time in nonverbal communication. Time perceptions include punctuality, willingness to wait, and interactions. The use of time can affect lifestyles, daily agendas, speed of speech, movements and how long people are willing to listen.

Monochronic time

A monochronic time system means that things are done one at a time and time is segmented into small precise units. Under this system, time is scheduled, arranged, and managed.

The United States considers itself a monochronic society. This perception came about during the Industrial Revolution. Many Americans think of time as a precious resource not to be wasted or taken lightly.  As a communication scholar Edward T. Hall wrote regarding the American's viewpoint of time in the business world, "the schedule is sacred." Hall says that for monochronic cultures, such as the American culture, "time is tangible" and viewed as a commodity where "time is money" or "time is wasted." John Ivers, a professor of cultural paradigms, agrees with Edward Hall by stating, "In the market sense, monochronic people consume time." The result of this perspective is that monochronic cultures place a paramount value on schedules, tasks, and "getting the job done."

Monochronic time orientation is very prominent in North European cultures, Italy, Greece, Spain, England, and the Scandinavian countries. For example, a businessperson from the USA has a meeting scheduled, they then grow frustrated because they are waiting an hour for their partner to arrive. This is an example of a monochronic time oriented individual running in with a polychronic time oriented individual. The interesting thing is that even though America is seen as one of the most monochronic countries it "has subcultures that may lean more to one side or the other of the monochronic-polychronic divide" within the states themselves. One can see this as they compare the southern states to the northern ones. John Ivers points this out with comparing waiters in the northern and southern restaurants. The waiters from the north are "to the point": they will "engage in little" and there is usually "no small talk." They are trying to be as efficient as possible, while those in the south will work towards "establishing a nice, friendly, micro-relationship" with the customer. They are still considerate of time, but it is not the most important goal in the south.

The culture of African Americans might also be seen as polychronic (see CP Time)

Polychronic time
A polychronic time system is a system where several things can be done at once, and wider view of time is exhibited and time is perceived in large fluid sections.

Examples of polychronic cultures are: Latin American, African, Arab, South Asian, and Native American cultures. These cultures' view on time can be connected to "natural rhythms, the earth, and the seasons". These analogies can be understood and compared because natural events can occur spontaneously and sporadically, just like polychronic time oriented people and polychronic time oriented cultures. A scenario would be an Inuit working in a factory in Alaska, the superiors blow a whistle to alert for break times, etc. The Inuit are not fond of that method because they determine their times by the sea tides, how long it takes place and how long it lasts. In polychronic cultures, "time spent with others" is considered a "task" and of importance to one's daily regimen.

Polychronic cultures are much less focused on the preciseness of accounting for time and more on tradition and relationships rather than on tasks. Polychronic societies have no problem being late for an appointment if they are deeply focused on some work or in a meeting that ran past schedule, because the concept of time is fluid and can easily expand or contract as need be. As a result, polychronic cultures have a much less formal perception of time. They are not ruled by precise calendars and schedules.

Measuring polychronicity
Bluedorn, Allen C., Carol Felker Kaufman, and Paul M. Lane concluded that "developing an understanding of the monochronic/polychronic continuum will not only result in a better self-management but will also allow more rewarding job performances and relationships with people from different cultures and traditions." Researchers have examined that predicting someone's polychronicity is plays an important role on productivity and individual well-being. Researchers have developed the following questionnaires to measure polychronicity:

 Inventory of Polychronic Values (IPV), developed by Bluedorn et al., which is a 10-item scale designed to assess "the extent to which people in a culture prefer to be engaged in two or more tasks or events simultaneously and believe their preference is the best way to do things."
 Polychronic Attitude Index (PAI), developed by Kaufman-Scarborough & Lindquist in 1991, which is a 4-item scale measuring individual preference for polychronicity, in the following statements:

 "I do not like to juggle several activities at the same time".
 "People should not try to do many things at once".
 "When I sit down at my desk, I work on one project at a time".
 "I am comfortable doing several things at the same time".

Predictable patterns between cultures with differing time systems

Cross-cultural perspectives on time
Conflicting attitudes between the monochronic and polychronic perceptions of time can interfere with cross-cultural relations and play a role on these domains, and as a result challenges can occur within an otherwise assimilated culture. One example in the United States is the Hawaiian culture, which employs two time systems: Haole time and Hawaiian time.

 According to Ashley Fulmer and Brandon Crosby, "as intercultural interactions increasingly become the norm rather than the exception, the ability of individuals, groups, and organizations to manage time effectively in cross-cultural settings is critical to the success of these interactions".

Time orientations 

The way an individual perceives time and the role time plays in their lives is a learned perspective.  As discussed by Alexander Gonzalez and Phillip Zimbardo, "every child learns a time perspective that is appropriate to the values and needs of his society" (Guerrero, DeVito & Hecht, 1999, p. 227).

There are four basic psychological time orientations:
 Past
 Time-line
 Present
 Future

Each orientation affects the structure, content, and urgency of communication (Burgoon, 1989).   The past orientation has a hard time developing the notion of elapsed time and these individuals often confuse present and past happenings as all in the same.  People oriented with time-line cognitivity are often detail oriented and think of everything in linear terms. These individuals also often have difficulty with comprehending multiple events at the same time.  Individuals with a present orientation are mostly characterized as pleasure seekers who live for the moment and have a very low risk aversion.  Those individuals who operate with future orientation are often thought of as being highly goal oriented and focused on the broad picture.

The use of time as a communicative channel can be a powerful, yet subtle, force in face-to-face interactions. Some of the more recognizable types of interaction that use time are:

Regulating interaction This is shown to aid in the orderly transition of conversational turn-taking. When the speaker is opening the floor for a response, they will pause. However, when no response is desired, the speaker will talk a faster pace with minimal pause. (Capella, 1985)
Expressing intimacy As relationships become more intimate, certain changes are made to accommodate the new relationship status. Some of the changes that are made include lengthening the time spent on mutual gazes, increasing the amount of time doing tasks for or with the other person and planning for the future by making plans to spend more time together (Patterson, 1990).
Affect management The onset of powerful emotions can cause a stronger affect, ranging from joy to sorrow or even to embarrassment. Some of the behaviors associated with negative affects include decreased time of gaze and awkwardly long pauses during conversations. When this happens, it is common for the individuals to try and decrease any negative affects and subsequently strengthen positive affects (Edelman & Iwawaki, 1987).
Evoking emotion Time can be used to evoke emotions in an interpersonal relationship by communicating the value of the relationship. For example, when someone who you have a close relationship with is late, you may not take it personally, especially if that is characteristic of them. However, if it is a meeting with a total stranger, their disrespect for the value of your time may be taken personally and could even cause you to display negative emotions if and when they do arrive for the meeting.
Facilitating service and task goals Professional settings can sometimes give rise to interpersonal relations which are quite different from other "normal" interactions. For example, the societal norms that dictate minimal touch between strangers are clearly altered if one member of the dyad is a doctor, and the environment is that of a hospital examination room.

Time orientation and consumers
Time orientation has also revealed insights into how people react to advertising. Martin, Gnoth and Strong (2009) found that future-oriented consumers react most favorably to ads that feature a product to be released in the distant future and that highlight primary product attributes. In contrast, present-oriented consumers prefer near-future ads that highlight secondary product attributes. Consumer attitudes were mediated by the perceived usefulness of the attribute information.

Culture and diplomacy

Cultural roots 
Just as monochronic and polychronic cultures have different time perspectives, understanding the time orientation of a culture is critical to becoming better able to successfully handle diplomatic situations. Americans think they have a future orientation. Hall indicates that for Americans "tomorrow is more important" and that they "are oriented almost entirely toward the future" (Cohen, 2004, p. 35). The future-focused orientation attributes to at least some of the concern that Americans have with "addressing immediate issues and moving on to new challenges" (Cohen, 2004, p. 35).

On the other hand, many polychronic cultures have a past-orientation toward time.

These time perspectives are the seeds for communication clashes in diplomatic situations. Trade negotiators have observed that "American negotiators are generally more anxious for agreement because "they are always in a hurry" and basically "problem solving oriented." In other words, they place a high value on resolving an issue quickly calling to mind the American catchphrase "some solution is better than no solution" (Cohen, 2004, p. 114). Similar observations have been made of Japanese-American relations. Noting the difference in time perceptions between the two countries, former ambassador to Tokyo, Mike Mansfield commented "We're too fast, they're too slow" (Cohen, 2004, p. 118).

Influence on global affairs 

Different perceptions of time across cultures can influence global communication. When writing about time perspective, Gonzalez and Zimbardo comment that "There is no more powerful, pervasive influence on how individuals think and cultures interact than our different perspectives on time—the way we learn how we mentally partition time into past, present and future."

Depending upon where an individual is from, their perception of time might be that "the clock rules the day" or that "we'll get there when we get there."
Improving prospects for success in the global community requires understanding cultural differences, traditions and communication styles.

The monochronic-oriented approach to negotiations is direct, linear and rooted in the characteristics that illustrate low context tendencies. The low context  culture approaches diplomacy in a lawyerly, dispassionate fashion with a clear idea of acceptable outcomes and a plan for reaching them. Draft arguments would be prepared elaborating positions. A monochronic culture, more concerned with time, deadlines and schedules, tends to grow impatient and want to rush to "close the deal."

More polychronic-oriented cultures come to diplomatic situations with no particular importance placed on time. Chronemics is one of the channels of nonverbal communication preferred by a High context Polychronic negotiator over verbal communication. The polychronic approach to negotiations will emphasize building trust between participants, forming coalitions and finding consensus. High context Polychronic negotiators might be charged with emotion toward a subject thereby obscuring an otherwise obvious solution.

Control of time in power relationships 

Time has a definite relationship to power. Though power most often refers to the ability to influence people, power is also related to dominance and status.

For example, in the workplace, those in a leadership or management position treat time and – by virtue of position – have their time treated differently from those who are of a lower stature position. Anderson and Bowman have identified three specific examples of how chronemics and power converge in the workplacewaiting time, talk time and work time.

Waiting time 
Researchers Insel and Lindgren write that the act of making an individual of a lower stature wait is a sign of dominance. They note that one who "is in the position to cause another to wait has power over him. To be kept waiting is to imply that one's time is less valuable than that of the one who imposes the wait."

Talk time 
There is a direct correlation between the power of an individual in an organization and conversation. This includes both length of conversation, turn-taking and who initiates and ends a conversation. Extensive research indicates that those with more power in an organization will speak more often and for a greater length of time. Meetings between superiors and subordinates provide an opportunity to illustrate this concept. A superior – regardless of whether or not they are running the actual meeting – lead discussions, ask questions and have the ability to speak for longer periods of time without interruption. Likewise, research shows that turn-taking is also influenced by power. Social psychologist Nancy Henley notes that "Subordinates are expected to yield to superiors and there is a cultural expectation that a subordinate will not interrupt a superior". The length of response follows the same pattern. While the superior can speak for as long as they want, the responses of the subordinate are shorter in length. Albert Mehrabian noted that deviation from this pattern led to negative perceptions of the subordinate by the superior. Beginning and ending a communication interaction in the workplace is also controlled by the higher-status individual in an organization. The time and duration of the conversation are dictated by the higher-status individual.

Work time 
The time of high status individuals is perceived as valuable, and they control their own time. On the other hand, a subordinate with less power has their time controlled by a higher status individual and are in less control of their time – making them likely to report their time to a higher authority. Such practices are more associated with those in non-supervisory roles or in blue collar rather than white collar professions. Instead, as power and status in an organization increases, the flexibility of the work schedule also increases. For instance, while administrative professionals might keep a 9 to 5 work schedule, their superiors may keep less structured hours. This does not mean that the superior works less. They may work longer, but the structure of their work environment is not strictly dictated by the traditional work day. Instead, as Koehler and their associates note "individuals who spend more time, especially spare time, to meetings, to committees, and to developing contacts, are more likely to be influential decision makers".

A specific example of the way power is expressed through work time is scheduling. As Yakura and others have noted in research shared by Ballard and Seibold, "scheduling reflects the extent to which the sequencing and duration of plans activities and events are formalized" (Ballard and Seibold, p. 6). Higher-status individuals have very precise and formal schedules – indicating that their stature requires that they have specific blocks of time for specific meetings, projects and appointments. Lower status individuals however, may have less formalized schedules. Finally, the schedule and appointment calendar of the higher status individual will take precedence in determining where, when and the importance of a specific event or appointment.

Associated theories

Expectancy violations theory 
Developed by Judee Burgoon, expectancy violations theory (EVT) sees communication as the exchange of information which is high in relational content and can be used to violate the expectations of another which will be perceived as either positively or negatively depending on the liking between the two people.

When our expectations are violated, we will respond in specific ways. If an act is unexpected and is assigned favorable interpretation, and it is evaluated positively, it will produce more favorable outcomes than an expected act with the same interpretation and evaluation.

Interpersonal adaptation theory 

The interpersonal adaptation theory (IAT), founded by Judee Burgoon, states that adaptation in interaction is responsive to the needs, expectations, and desires of communicators and affects how communicators position themselves in relation to one another and adapt to one another's communication. For example, they may match each other's behavior, synchronize the timing of behavior, or behave in dissimilar ways. It is also important to note that individuals bring to interactions certain requirements that reflect basic human needs, expectations about behavior based on social norms, and desires for interaction based on goals and personal preferences (Burgoon, Stern & Dillman, 1995).

See also
 African time
 Paul Virilio
 Philosophy of space and time

References 

Adler, ROBIN.B., Lawrence B.R., & Towne, N. (1995). Interplay (6th ed.). Fort Worth: Hardcourt Brace College.
Ballard, D & Seibold, D., Communication-related organizational structures and work group temporal differences: the effects of coordination method, technology type, and feedback cycle on members' construals and enactments of time. Communication Monographs, Vol. 71, No. 1, March 2004, pp. 1–27
Buller D.B., & Burgoon, J.K. (1996). Interpersonal deception theory. Communication Theory, 6, 203–242.
Buller, D.B., Burgoon, J.K., & Woodall, W.G. (1996). Nonverbal communications: The unspoken dialogue (2nd ed.). New York: McGraw-Hill.
Burgoon, J.K., Stern, L.A., & Dillman, L. (1995). Interpersonal adaptation: Dyadic interaction patterns. Massachusetts: Cambridge University Press.
Capella, J. N. (1985). Controlling the floor in conversation. In A. Siegman and S. Feldstein (Eds.), Multichannel integrations of nonverbal behavior, (pp. 69–103). Hillsdale, NJ: Erlbaum
Cohen, R. (2004). Negotiating across cultures: International communication in an interdependent world (rev. ed.). Washington, DC: United States Institute of Peace.
Eddelman, R.J., and Iwawaki, S. (1987). Self-reported expression and the consequences of embarrassment in the United Kingdom and Japan. Psychologia, 30, 205-216
Griffin, E. (2000). A first look at communication theory (4th ed). Boston, MA: McGraw Hill.
Gonzalez, G., & Zimbardo, P. (1985). Time in perspective. Psychology Today Magazine, 20–26.
Hall, E.T. & Hall, M. R. (1990). Understanding cultural differences: Germans, French, and Americans. Boston, MA: Intercultural Press.
Hall, J.A., & Kapp, M.L. (1992). Nonverbal communication in human interaction (3rd ed.). New York: Holt Rinehart and Winston, Inc.
Knapp, M. L. & Miller, G.R.  (1985). Handbook of Interpersonal Communication. Beverly Hills: Sage Publications.
Koester, J., & Lustig, M.W.  (2003). Intercultural competence (4th ed.). New York: Pearson Education, Inc.
Patterson, M.L. (1990). Functions of non-verbal behavior in social interaction.
H. Giles & W.P. Robinson (Eds), Handbook of Language and Social Psychology, Chichester, G.B.: Wiley
West, R., & Turner, L. H. (2000). Introducing communication theory: Analysis and application. Mountain View, CA: Mayfield.
Wood, J. T. (1997). Communication theories in action: An introduction. Belmont, CA: Wadsworth.
Ivers, J. J. (2017). For Deep Thinkers Only. John J. Ivers

Further reading
Bluedorn, A.C. (2002). The human organization of time: Temporal realities and experience. Stanford, CA: Stanford University Press.
Cohen, R. (2004). Negotiating across cultures: International communication in an interdependent world (rev. ed.). Washington, DC: United States Institute of Peace.
Griffin, E. (2000). A first look at communication theory (4th ed). Boston, MA: McGraw Hill.
Hugg, A. (2002, February 4).  Universal language. Retrieved May 10, 2007 from Website:     
Osborne, H. (2006, January/February).  In other words…actions can speak as clearly as words. Retrieved May 12, 2007 from Website: http://www.healthliteracy.com/article.asp?PageID=3763
Wessel, R.  (2003, January 9).  Is there time to slow down?. Retrieved May 10, 2007 from Website: http://www.csmonitor.com/2003/0109/p13s01-sten.html
 A sonnet on the topic by the editor of the 11th edition (1910) of the Encyclopædia Britannica.

External links 
  
 
 
  

Nonverbal communication
Social constructionism
Time